Josh Petersdorf is an American voice actor, known for voicing Roadhog in Overwatch and Director Ton in the English dub of Aggretsuko.

Filmography

References

External links
 
 

Living people
American male video game actors
American male voice actors
21st-century American male actors
Year of birth missing (living people)
Place of birth missing (living people)